The 2022 Atlantic Coast Conference women's soccer tournament was the 35th edition of the ACC Women's Soccer Tournament, which decided the Atlantic Coast Conference champion. Florida State was the defending champion.

The first round was played at campus sites, while the semifinals and final were be played at Sahlen's Stadium in Cary, NC.

Florida State successfully defended their title, defeating Notre Dame in the Semifinals and North Carolina in the final, 2–1.  This was the ninth title for Florida State as a program, and the first for head coach Brian Pensky.  Florida State has won the past three ACC tournaments.

Qualification 

The top six teams in the Atlantic Coast Conference earned a berth into the ACC Tournament. The top two teams earned a bye to the semifinals. The final seedings were determined after the final day of the regular season on October 27, 2022.  Multiple tiebreakers were required as teams finished with the same conference records.  North Carolina and Florida State both finished with 8–2–0 conference records and tied for first place in the regular season.  North Carolina defeated Florida State on October 20, during the regular season, and therefore earned the top seed in the tournament, while Florida State was the second seed.  A second tiebreaker was required between Virginia and Duke as both teams finished 6–2–2 in conference play.  Virginia defeated Duke on October 2, during the regular season, and earned the fourth seed, while Duke was the fifth seed.

Bracket

Schedule

First round

Semifinals

Final

Statistics

Goalscorers

All-Tournament team 

MVP in boldSource:

References 

ACC Women's Soccer Tournament
2022 Atlantic Coast Conference women's soccer season
ACC women's soccer tournament
ACC women's soccer tournament
ACC women's soccer tournament